Evgeny Alekseyevich Nechkasov (Russian: Евгений Алексеевич Нечкасов; b. 5 October 1991) is a Russian writer and publisher, ideologist of Pagan traditionalism and Germanic Heathenry. He uses the pseudonym Askr Svarte which comes from the Old Norse Askr plus the adjective Svartr, meaning "Black Ash (Tree)".

Nechkasov is a descendant of German colonists from Württemberg who settled in the lands of Bessarabia in Moldova and near Odessa, Ukraine in the 19th century. They were exiled to Siberia in the early years of World War II.

Ideas and Activity
Nechkasov is the founder of the Siberian Germanic Heathen community "Svarte Aske" (which identifies itself as Odinist) and the editor-in-chief of the Foundation for Traditional Religions, a Russian organization which promotes and analyzes news and studies pertaining to Paganism with the aim of protecting and promoting Pagan and indigenous religions in Russia.

Nechkasov is the author of several books on Pagan traditionalism and the Left-Hand Path in Heathenism in which he polemicizes from a Traditionalist point of view against what he calls modern and postmodern influences on contemporary Paganism worldwide.

Nechkasov's works also focus on the reconciliation of traditionalist and Heideggerian philosophies with Pagan theology and worldview. Following Ernst Jünger, Martin Heidegger, and Pentti Linkola, the problem of the influence of technology and progress on existential alienation is also a central concern of Nechkasov's thought.

Since 2015, Nechkasov has been the editor-in-chief of the annual Russian traditionalist almanac Warha. To date, seven issues have been released in Russian and two in English. Nechkasov has been featured as a guest writer in the Russian magazine Rodnovery (Russian: Родноверие), the academic journal Colloquium Heptaplomeres established by the Russian scholar of religion Roman Shizhensky from Nizhny Novgorod State Pedagogical University, and in the Ukrainian traditionalist almanac Tradition and Traditionalism (Russian: Традиция и Традиционализм).

In 2015, Nechkasov also appeared in a documentary sponsored by the Russian Ministry of Culture, The Last Campaign of the Baron, about the controversial figure of Roman von Ungern-Sternberg, who was executed in Novonikolayevsk, now Novosibirsk, in 1921.

Since 2017, Nechkasov has been a featured expert and public speaker on Pagan traditionalism and general modern Paganism in the Russian press, TV, conferences, and in the field of religious studies.

Nechkasov was a member and head of the Novosibirsk local chapter of the Eurasian Youth Union of Aleksandr Dugin from 2011 to 2013. He is an advocate of folkish and tribal currents in modern Paganism, promotes the appreciation of the plurality of cultures and traditions, and staunchly rejects universalism and globalism.

Written works

Books in Russian
 Polemos: Языческий традиционализм (2016)
 
 
 
 Приближение и окружение (2017)

Books in English
 Gap (2015)
 Gap: A Left-Hand Path Approach to Odinism (2017, 2nd release by Fall of Man Press)
 Gap: At the Left Hand of Odin (2019, 3rd release by Fall of Man Press)

See also
 Veleslav
 Julius Evola
 Aleksandr Dugin
 Martin Heidegger
 Germanic Heathenism
 Left-hand path and right-hand path

References

External links
 
 Academia.edu page

1991 births
Living people
Russian modern pagans
Adherents of Germanic neopaganism
Writers from Novosibirsk
Modern pagan writers
Bessarabia-German people
Russian people of German descent